Gaétan Lelièvre is a Canadian politician. He is a member of the National Assembly of Quebec for the riding of Gaspé, first elected in the 2012 election and re-elected in 2014.

He was removed from the PQ caucus on May 16, 2017 after admitting to having received numerous gifts and perks from engineering firm Roche while serving as director general of the city of Gaspé.

References

Living people
Members of the Executive Council of Quebec
Independent MNAs in Quebec
Parti Québécois MNAs
People from Gaspésie–Îles-de-la-Madeleine
21st-century Canadian politicians
Year of birth missing (living people)
Politicians affected by a party expulsion process